Aviara is a resort neighborhood in the southern part of Carlsbad, located in San Diego County, California. The community is approximately 30 minutes from downtown San Diego. In 1989, the community was developed and later incorporated into the city of Carlsbad. As of 2005, it had a total population of 5,050.

The community is set in the hills of southern Carlsbad, overlooking the Pacific Ocean and Batiquitos Lagoon. Aviara is just north of the city of Encinitas and west of the neighborhood of La Costa, also located in Carlsbad. The community is mostly residential except for the Park Hyatt Resort and Aviara Golf and Country Club. In the annual Forbes magazine ranking of "Most Expensive Zip Codes" in the U.S., Aviara's 92011 ZIP Code ranked among some of the most expensive in the nation. Many properties have views of the ocean, Batiquitos Lagoon, and Aviara golf course. The community is noted for its lush landscaping, gated communities, and abundance of jacaranda trees that frame many of the streets.

During 2008, Aviara was the only community in San Diego County not affected by the housing crisis.

To preserve quality of life, the community council has numerous stringent ordinances, including laws against dead lawns, architectural styles, permanent basketball hoops and courts, satellite dishes and exterior paint colors. It is also a violation to leave trashcans on the street or in public view. With the exception of one community, Mirabella, multi-family housing is not permitted.

The community received some media attention in 2004 when a resident was arrested for defrauding an estimated $191 million from elderly people across the United States. Larre Jaye Schlarmann and three others were each ordered held on $144 million bail. In 2005 Schlarmann entered into a plea agreement, pleading guilty to money laundering and elder abuse.

Well-known residents of the area include members of the Pulitzer family.

Demographics
Population: 5,050
Area: .
Median Age: 42.8 years
Total Housing Units: 2,025
Zip Code: 92011

Geography

Education
Younger children attend Aviara Oaks Elementary and Middle Schools while Carlsbad High School serves the older students. Sage Creek High School is the second high school in the Carlsbad Unified School District that opened its doors for 2013-2014 school year. Private schools including Pacific Ridge School, Horizon Prep, St. Patrick's School, and Army & Navy Academy are located close by.

Attraction
Aviara also houses one of the best golf courses in North America, the Aviara Golf Club, featuring a coastal layout with a par of 72, 18 holes over 7,007 yards sculpted around the rolling hillsides.

In popular culture
The Real Housewives of Miami star and former Dancing With the Stars contestant, Joanna Krupa, married her longtime love, Romain Zago, at the Park Hyatt Aviara Resort for a reported $1 million wedding. The wedding was featured on Bravo's show.

Notes 

Neighborhoods in Carlsbad, California
Gated communities in California